Lyailya Galievna Galimzhanova (1924-2017) was a Soviet-Kazakhstani Politician (Communist).

She served as Minister of Culture in 1967–1975.
She served as Minister of Social Security in 1985–1990.

References

20th-century Kazakhstani women politicians
20th-century Kazakhstani politicians
Soviet women in politics
Kazakhstani communists
Women government ministers of Kazakhstan
1924 births
2017 deaths